The Humăria is a left tributary of the river Stavnic in eastern Romania. It flows into the Stavnic in Frenciugi. The Stavnic is a tributary of the Bârlad, which in turn is a tributary of the Siret, which joins the Danube.

References

Rivers of Romania
Rivers of Iași County